The 1988 Critérium du Dauphiné Libéré was the 40th edition of the cycle race and was held from 31 May to 5 June 1988. The race started in Avignon and finished in Saint-Pierre-de-Chartreuse. The race was won by Luis Herrera of the Café de Colombia team.

Teams
Fourteen teams, containing a total of 125 riders, participated in the race:

 
 
 
 
 
 
 
 
 
 
 
 
 France amateur team
 Colombia amateur team

Route

General classification

References

Further reading

1988
1988 in French sport
May 1988 sports events in Europe
June 1988 sports events in Europe